Advanced Placement (AP) Chinese Language and Culture (commonly known as AP Chinese) is a course and exam offered by the College Board as a part of the Advanced Placement Program in the United States. It requires proficiencies throughout the Intermediate range as described in the American Council on the Teaching of Foreign Languages (ACTFL) Proficiency Guidelines. The course interweaves language and culture learning and is conducted mostly in Mandarin Chinese. The first AP Chinese test was administered on May 9, 2007. This course has the highest percentage of 5 scores out of all AP tests, a result of many native Chinese speakers taking the exam.

Exam
The AP Chinese Language and Culture Exam is approximately 2 hours and 15 minutes in length. It assesses Interpersonal, Interpretive, and Presentational communication skills in Mandarin Chinese, along with knowledge of Chinese culture.

Section I consists of multiple-choice questions.
 Part A: Listening
 Part B: Reading
Section II, the free-response section, requires one to produce written and spoken responses.
 Part A: Writing
 Part B: Speaking

Grade distribution
The AP Chinese Language and Culture exam consistently has the most students receiving a score of 5, this is likely attributed to fluent Chinese speakers taking the exam for credit. The grade distributions since 2010 were:

See also
Chinese as a foreign language
Language education in the United States

References

External links
 AP Chinese Language and Culture at CollegeBoard.com
 Teacher Resources for AP Chinese Course at CollegeBoard.com
 AP Chinese Language and Culture Course

Chinese language tests
Advanced Placement